The Pushyamitras were a tribe who lived in Central India during the 5th century CE. Living on the banks of the river Narmada, they are believed to have posed a serious threat to the Gupta Empire during the late period of Kumaragupta I's reign.

History
The Puranas record thirteen kings of the Pushyamitra dynasty and have been placed in the 3rd century of the Christian Era.

Existence
The Pushyamitras are only known from the inscription of Skandagupta in which he emphasizes his role in defeating the Pushyamitras, of which the reading is sometimes disputed (it could be "Yudhy-amitrdths-cha" rather than "Pushyamitrams-cha"), as well as a single mention in the Puranas. Therefore their existence is sometimes doubted. The people Skandagupta fought could more probably have been a confederation including the Vakatakas. The dynasty of the Vakatakas ended around that time in a war, when, according to the Dashakumaracharita, attacking the area of Vanavasi  to the south, they were in turn attacked from the rear resulting in the death of the last Vakataka king.

War against the Guptas
Inscriptions covering the events between 455 and 467 CE emphasize the role of Skandagupta, Kumaragupta's successor, in defeating the Pushyamitras.

The Pushyamitras were subjugated by Skandagupta after a long and strenuous fight, as they "had developed great power and many resources in terms of military & wealth".The inscription says that at one point the situation became so serious that Skandagupta had to pass a whole night on the bare ground (the field). The critical situation was eventually tided over by him & emerged victorious.This victory took place towards the close of Kumaragupta's reign. So Kumaragupta was probably too old to lead the army himself. So his son Skandagupta bore the brunt of the struggle, who was chosen by him to deal with the danger of the Pushyamitras. This victory was so memorable & important, we are told in the Bhitari inscription that people sang the songs of his glory in every nook and corner of the empire. Goyal thinks that the Pandumvamshi king Bharatabala was the king leading the Pushyamitra rebellion.

See also
 Vardhana dynasty

References

Gupta Empire
5th century
Tribes of India